James Frank "Jim" Morrison (April 11, 1942 – November 25, 2010) was a Republican member of the Kansas House of Representatives, who represented the 121st district. He served from August 4, 1992 until his death on November 25, 2010.

Morrison worked as an optometrist since 1967 and as a broadcast engineer from 1973. He earned a BS and OD from the Southern College of Optometry, in Memphis, Tennessee.

He was a member of the Rotary Club, Fellow American Academy of Optometry, Kansas Optometric Association, and the Lions Club.

Committee membership
 Health and Human Services
 Government Efficiency and Fiscal Oversight (Chair)
 Joint Committee on Information Technology

Major donors
The top 5 donors to Morrison's 2008 campaign:
 Morrison, Jim 	$2,772 	
 Kansas Contractors Assoc 	$800 	
 Prairie Band Potawatomi Nation	$750 	
 Koch Industries 	$500 	
 Taylor, Louis 	$500

References

External links
 Official website
 Kansas Legislature - James Morrison
 Project Vote Smart profile
 Kansas Votes profile
 Campaign contributions: 1996, 1998, 2000, 2002, 2004, 2006, 2008

Republican Party members of the Kansas House of Representatives
People from Thomas County, Kansas
American optometrists
1942 births
2010 deaths
20th-century American politicians
21st-century American politicians